Thomas G. Healey (1818–1897) was an Atlanta real estate developer, politician, street railway entrepreneur and banker. Healey started in the brick-making business and as a builder and contractor in partnership with Maxwell Berry who together managed the construction of Church (now Shrine) of the Immaculate Conception and the United States U.S. Post Office and Customs House (later used as City Hall). Healey invested in land including the northwest corner of Marietta and Peachtree Streets where he built the first Healey Building.

Healey's other endeavors included:
In 1873, co-founded the Bank of the State of Georgia
From 1877 to 1882, president of the Atlanta Gas Light Company
In the 1880s, president of the West End & Atlanta Street Railroad
Executive Committee of the 1881 International Cotton Exposition
Director of Joel Hurt's Atlanta Home Insurance Company
City alderman-at-large (1881) and mayor pro tem (1884)

Legacy
After Thomas Healey's death in 1897, his son William carried on the family businesses, which included the construction of the second Healey Building (1914, still standing) in the Fairlie-Poplar district of downtown Atlanta.

The William-Oliver Building was built on the site of the first Healey Building in 1930, and is named after Healey's two grandsons.

References

Businesspeople from Atlanta
Real estate and property developers
Atlanta City Council members
19th-century American railroad executives
1818 births
1897 deaths
19th-century American politicians